Ixora foliosa is a species of flowering plant in the family Rubiaceae. It is found in western Cameroon and eastern Nigeria. Its natural habitats are subtropical or tropical moist lowland forests and subtropical or tropical moist montane forests. It is threatened by habitat loss.

References

External links
World Checklist of Rubiaceae

foliosa
Vulnerable plants
Taxonomy articles created by Polbot